IceCat may refer to:
 Open ICEcat, an Open Content project in which a worldwide open catalogue is created for product information
 Mohawk Valley IceCats, an NEHL team based in Utica, New York
 Norfolk IceCats, an NEHL team based in Simcoe, ON
 Worcester IceCats, an ice hockey team in the American Hockey League who played in Worcester, Massachusetts
 The club hockey team of the Arizona Wildcats
 GNU IceCat, a web browser formerly known as GNU IceWeasel, based on Mozilla Firefox
 IceCat is the brand name of an electric Ice resurfacer machine manufactured by UKKO in Finland
 Icecat is the EU community trademark of the publisher involved in Open ICEcat